The 2009 FIVB Women's Junior Volleyball World Championship was held in Tijuana and Mexicali, Mexico from July 16 to 25, 2009. 16 teams participated in the tournament.

Qualification process

 Czech Republic qualified as the best second place of the 2009 Women's Junior European Volleyball Championship Qualification's groups.

Pools composition

First round
All times are Mexico's Pacific Time (UTC−07:00).

Pool A

|}

|}

Pool B

|}

|}

Pool C

|}

|}

Pool D

|}

|}

Second round

Pool E (1st–8th)

|}

|}

Pool F (1st–8th)

|}

|}

Pool G (9th–16th)

|}

|}

Pool H (9th–16th)

|}

|}

Final round

13th–16th bracket

|}

|}

|}

9th–12th bracket

|}

|}

|}

5th–8th bracket

|}

|}

|}

Championship bracket

Semifinals

|}

Bronze Medal match

|}

Gold Medal match

|}

Final standing

Individual awards

Most Valuable Player

Best Scorer

Best Spiker

Best Blocker

Best Server

Best Digger

Best Setter

Best Receiver

Best Libero

References

See also
 Results.
 FIVB News.

World Championship
Women's U20 Volleyball World Championship
Volleyball
FIVB Volleyball Women's U20 World Championship
FIVB Women's Junior World Championship
2009 in youth sport
2009 in Mexican women's sports